The 2022 Rackley Roofing 200 was the fourteenth stock car race of the 2022 NASCAR Camping World Truck Series, and the 13th iteration of the event. The race was held on Friday, June 24, 2022, in Gladeville, Tennessee at Nashville Superspeedway, a  permanent D-shaped racetrack. The race took it's scheduled 150 laps to complete. Ryan Preece, driving for David Gilliland Racing, would start from the pole, lead the most laps, and earn his 2nd career NASCAR Camping World Truck Series win, along with his first of the season. To fill out the podium, Zane Smith, driving for Front Row Motorsports, and Carson Hocevar, driving for Niece Motorsports, would finish 2nd and 3rd, respectively.

Background 
The track was built in 2001 and is currently hosting the Ally 400, a NASCAR Cup Series regular season event, the Tennessee Lottery 250, and the Rackley Roofing 200.

It is a concrete oval track 1 miles (2.145 km) long. Nashville Superspeedway is owned by Speedway Motorsports, which acquired the track's previous owner Dover Motorsports in December 2021. Nashville Superspeedway is the longest concrete oval in NASCAR. Current permanent seating capacity is approximately 25,000, but will reach up to 38,000 for the NASCAR Cup Series event in 2021. Additional portable seats are brought in for some events, and seating capacity can be expanded to 150,000. Infrastructure is in place to expand the facility to include a short track, drag strip, and road course.

Entry list 

 (R) denotes rookie driver.

Practice 
The only 30-minute practice session was held on Friday, June 24, at 3:00 PM CST.

Qualifying 
Qualifying was on Saturday, June 24, at 3:30 PM CST. Since Nashville Superspeedway is an oval track, the qualifying system used is a single-car, one-lap system with only one round. Whoever sets the fastest time in the round wins the pole.

Notes

Race results 
Stage 1 Laps: 45

Stage 2 Laps: 50

Stage 3 Laps: 55

Standings after the race 

Drivers' Championship standings

Note: Only the first 10 positions are included for the driver standings.

References 

2022 NASCAR Camping World Truck Series
NASCAR races at Nashville Superspeedway
Rackley Roofing 200
2022 in sports in Tennessee